Pedicia inconstans is a species of hairy-eyed crane fly in the family Pediciidae.

Subspecies
These two subspecies belong to the species Pedicia inconstans:
 Pedicia inconstans calcaroides Alexander, 1940
 Pedicia inconstans inconstans Osten Sacken, 1848

References

Pediciidae
Articles created by Qbugbot
Insects described in 1859